A sport moped is a moped that resembles a sport bike and often performs better than standard mopeds. They were created to circumvent UK legislation, called the "Sixteeners Laws", aimed at taking young motorcycle riders off the road. The new laws, introduced in 1971 by Conservative Party Minister for Transport John Peyton, forbade 16-year-olds from riding motorcycles of  capacity, thus limiting them to 50 cc machines until they turned 17.

Description
The law resulted in motorcycle manufacturers developing a new class of high-performance mopeds in the 1970s, termed "sports mopeds" or, colloquially, "sixteener specials," due to their marketing being aimed at 16-year-olds, a move which was widely criticized at the time.

To achieve higher performance, motorcyclists frequently modify the engines, such as installing a big bore kit which raises the displacement. Sport bikes with 125 cc displacements are sometimes registered as 50 cc mopeds to avoid certain state or federal regulations. Because of this, many manufacturers use identical frames and components in both 125 cc sport bikes and 50 cc sport mopeds, allowing a 125 cc engine to be swapped into a 50 cc sport moped frame. Examples of this are the Aprilia RS50 and RS125, the Derbi GPR50 and GPR125, the Yamaha TZR50 and TZR125, and the Gilera DNA 50 and 125.

Some sport bikes use the Minarelli AM6 engine (2T) (Aprilia RS 50 (1999-2005), Rieju RS2 Matrix 50, Peugeot XR6, Yamaha TZR 50, Malaguti Drakon 50), while other use Piaggio engines (Derbi GPR 50, and Gilera DNA).

Few sport bikes, for example: Gilera DNA and Kingway Fennari were produced with an automatic gearbox.

Bicycle-style pedals were installed when new legislation was passed requiring them. These models were produced from 1972 onwards by Japanese manufacturers Honda, Yamaha, and Suzuki, as well as European companies such as Puch, Fantic, Gilera, Gitane, and Garelli.  The most famous of these versions was the Yamaha FS1-E. They included roadsters, enduro and motorcrossers, cafe racers and choppers or Scooters, and led to a boom in motorcycling similar to the early 1960s rocker period. The government passed further legislation in 1977 which was more restrictive, limiting mopeds to a weight of 250 kg and a top speed of 30 mph. This later legislation contributed to the demise of the UK motorcycle market. No such restrictions existed in continental Europe, and such vehicles could be ridden by 14-year-olds.

Sport mopeds, currently and formerly produced

On Chinese components
Zipp Pro 50, Zipp Pro 50 GT, Zipp XRace 50
Romet RR 50, Romet Arrow Fly
Junak 901 RS, Junak 901 Sport, Junak 903 Race
Keeway Leone RK50
Kinroad Sprinter (also known as Kinroad XT50-18) / Ventus Sprinter
Kingway Fennari
Barton FR 50
Pulse Rage 50 (also known as LK50GY-2)

On Spanish, Italian, French and Japanese components
Gilera DNA 50
Aprilia RS 50 (four generations)
Aprilia Tuono 50
Aprilia AF1 50
Derbi GPR 50
Rieju RS1 Evolution 50, Rieju RS2 Matrix 50
Peugeot XR6, Peugeot XR7
Yamaha TZR 50
Cagiva Mito 50
Suzuki RG Gamma 50
Malaguti Drakon 50

There are also Minibike sport mopeds; for example: Honda NSR50 and Yamaha YSR50.

References

Mopeds
Sport bikes